A number of ships have been named Inverness after the city in Scotland, including:-

, a barque in service 1869–96.
, a steamship in service 1899–1901.
, a steamship in service 1902–29.
, a steamship in service 1940–41.
, a motor vessel in service 1946–53.
, a Sandown-class minesweeper in service 1991–2004

References

Ship names